Roma Burnett  (née Downey) is an actress, producer, and author from Derry, Northern Ireland. For nine seasons she played Monica the angel in the CBS television series Touched by an Angel. She produced the mini-series The Bible for the History Channel and also appeared in it as Mary, mother of Jesus. She has performed on stage with the Abbey Theatre, The National Theatre of Ireland, and has appeared both on and off Broadway. She played the leading role of Jacqueline Kennedy Onassis in the Emmy award-winning miniseries A Woman Named Jackie for NBC.

Downey starred in and was executive producer for a number of television movies for the CBS network, including Borrowed Hearts and Second Honeymoon. She is an ambassador for Operation Smile, serving on missions to Honduras, Vietnam, and Jordan. On 11 August 2016 she was honored with a star on the Hollywood Walk of Fame. In 2021, Downey received the Lifetime Achievement Award for the International Christian Film & Music Festival. In 2021, she received the Lifetime Achievement Award for the International Christian Film & Music Festival and was named an Officer of the Order of the British Empire for services to the Arts, Drama and to the Community in Northern Ireland.

As President of Lightworkers Media, the faith and family division of MGM, Downey and her husband, Mark Burnett, produced the Emmy-nominated miniseries The Bible for History channel, which was watched by over 100 million people in the United States. Downey and Burnett also executive-produced the feature films Ben-Hur starring Jack Huston, Toby Kebbell and Morgan Freeman, Son of God (2014), Little Boy, Woodlawn, Resurrection, Messiah and Country Ever After which aired in 2021. Variety recognized Downey and Burnett as "Trailblazers" and listed Downey as one of Variety's "100 Most Powerful Women in Hollywood".  The Hollywood Reporter included the couple in their "Most Influential People of 2013" and Downey as one of the "100 Women in Entertainment Power" in 2014. She was honored on Variety's "Women of Impact in 2014". Downey and Burnett also produced The Dovekeepers based on the best selling book by Alice Hoffman for CBS and A.D. The Bible Continues for NBC, Women of the Bible for Lifetime, Answered Prayers for TLC. Downey is the executive producer of the documentary "Faithkeepers" about the persecution of Christians in the Middle East, "Bump Along the Way", and of the short film Rough which won the IFTA for best short film in 2021.

Early life
Downey was born and raised in Derry, Northern Ireland, in the Bogside district. Roma is named after her two grandmothers, Ro from Rose and Ma from Mary, joined to make Roma. She attended Thornhill College, a Catholic girls school. Her mother, Maureen O'Reilly Downey, a housewife with an interest in the performing arts, died from a heart attack at age 48 when Downey was 10 years old. Her father, Patrick Downey, was a mortgage broker. Her father died when Downey was 20. Originally, she planned to be a painter and earned a Bachelor of Arts at Brighton College of Art. Roma studied BA (Hons) Expressive Arts at Brighton Polytechnic. Based at the Falmer campus, she combined Art and Drama for her degree. She then went on to study acting in London at The Drama Studio.

Career
She joined the Abbey Players, based at the Abbey Theatre in Dublin, and toured the United States in a production of The Playboy of the Western World. Downey moved to New York City after an agent, whom she met during the tour of The Playboy of the Western World, suggested she had potential for success there. She took a job as a coat checker at an Upper West Side restaurant before getting cast in Broadway shows.

The production led to a nomination during the Broadway run for the Helen Hayes Best Actress Award in 1991. She also starred on Broadway in The Circle with Sir Rex Harrison and also at the Roundabout Theater and The Public Theater in New York City.

Downey played the role of Jacqueline Kennedy Onassis in the American television miniseries A Woman Named Jackie (1991) which won the Emmy Award for Outstanding Miniseries in 1992.

Touched by an Angel

Downey's role as Jacqueline Kennedy led to her most famous role, as the angel Monica, on the CBS series Touched by an Angel, opposite singer-actress, Della Reese, and John Dye which ran from 1994 to 2003.

She received one nomination and one win at the TV Guide awards for favorite actress and also  received two Emmy Award nominations and two Golden Globe nominations. Downey has said the character Monica interested her because it was a strong female role, which were "few and far between" and for its spiritual aspects: Downey has also spoken of her deep and lasting love for and friendship with Della Reese. The two remained close until Reese's death on 19 November 2017. She commented that Reese was "such an influence on my life. She was my mother. I was a girl without a mother and for certain God brought her into my life. She was one of the lasting gifts of Touched by an Angel."

The Bible
On 24 May 2011, Downey and husband Mark Burnett announced they were producing a 10-hour docudrama for the History channel, The Bible, based on stories from the Bible scheduled to air in 2013. They began planning it in 2009 and lined up their own financing. The full production cost was US$22 million. Downey and Burnett wanted to stay as true to the content in the Bible as possible so they put together a wide variety of pastors and academics to review the script and filming. For example, they worked with Pastors Joel Osteen and Rick Warren and academics such as Craig A. Evans and Mark Goodacre.

The Bible has been watched by over 100 million viewers in the United States alone  The series has been the number one downloaded series in iTunes and ranked on Amazon's best sellers in movies and television. A theatrical release was released on 28 February 2014 in the United States, under the title Son of God. The Bible was nominated for the 2013 Primetime Emmy Award for Outstanding Miniseries or Movie. Downey played the role of Mary, the mother of Jesus. The Bible was filmed in 2012 in Morocco.

In July 2013, it was announced that Downey and Burnett would produce A.D., the sequel to The Bible. In December 2013, NBC ordered A.D.. The series covered the spread of Christianity after the death and resurrection of Jesus Christ.

Other work
Downey also produced and starred in television movies including Borrowed Hearts and Second Honeymoon. During the run of Touched by an Angel, she recorded the spoken-word album Healing Angel. and wrote the children's book Love Is A Family. She also coauthored a book with her husband "A Story of God and All of Us". She hosted It's a Miracle (TV series), on the Pax Network and appeared on stage in A Picasso at the Geffen Theatre in Los Angeles.  She portrayed Annie Sullivan in the TV movie Monday After the Miracle (1998). She has hosted Saturday Night Live, was one of People Magazine'''s most beautiful people. She is a spokesperson for the volunteer group "Operation Smile".  In 2009, she starred in the movie Come Dance at My Wedding alongside John Schneider. On 16 July 2011, she appeared with actress Marion Ross in the made-for-TV movie Keeping up with the Randalls, broadcast on the Hallmark Channel.
Downey is the executive producer of the animated video series, Little Angels, which was released on DVD with 20th Century Fox Home Entertainment on 14 February 2012.

In December 2013, CBS announced a new miniseries with Downey and Burnett, The Dovekeepers based on the New York Times Bestseller by Alice Hoffman. The miniseries aired in 2015. In September 2014, MGM acquired a 55% interest in One Three Media and Lightworkers Media. The two companies consolidated into a new film and television company, United Artists Media Group. Burnett became UA's CEO and Downey became president of LightWorkers Media.

In December 2015, MGM acquired the remaining 45% of Hearst's, Burnett's and Downey's interests in United Artists Media Group (UAMG), which was absorbed under the MGM Television Group umbrella. Downey remains President of LightWorkers Media, which became the Faith & Family division of MGM.

Downey executive produced a re-telling of Ben-Hur, starring Jack Huston, which was released in August 2016.

On Nov. 16, 2016, it was announced Roma Downey and her husband Mark Burnett were starting the religious-themed TV network Light TV airing on Fox stations and affiliates. It was reported on Dec. 5, 2020, that Light TV would stop broadcasting and be replaced by TheGrio.TV.

Downey is the author of several books, including "Unexpected Blessings" and "Box of Butterflies" which became a NY Times best seller.

Personal life
Downey is married to television producer Mark Burnett. She has two step-sons, James Burnett and Cameron Burnett, and a daughter, Reilly Marie Downey Anspaugh (born 3 June 1996) from her previous marriage to director David Anspaugh. She was also previously married to actor Leland Orser. Reilly is named after her grandmother, Maureen O'Reilly Downey. On Thanksgiving Day 2006, Burnett proposed to Downey during a family vacation in Zihuatanejo, Mexico. They wed on 28 April 2007 in their Malibu home. Her Touched by an Angel co-star, Della Reese, officiated at the wedding.

Downey is a "Smile Ambassador" for the non-profit organization Operation Smile which provides surgeries for children around the world who were born with severe cleft lip and palate. She has traveled on several international missions with the group to Vietnam, Honduras, and Jordan.

She supported the unsuccessful candidacy of Martin McGuinness for President of Ireland in 2011. Downey received the Sally Award by the Salvation Army for her contribution to entertainment and helping those in need on 1 October 2015.

Downey was raised a Roman Catholic. She and her husband Burnett describe themselves as Christians. 

On 18 April 2009, Downey and Burnett delivered the keynote address and accepted honorary doctorate degrees at Pepperdine University's Graziadio School of Business and Management commencement ceremony.

In Feb 2016 Downey and Burnett gave the keynote address at the National Prayer Breakfast held in Washington DC by President Obama

Downey also has a Doctor of Fine Art (DFA) honorary degree from the University of Ulster for her outstanding contribution to acting and philanthropy, and she and Burnett received honorary Doctor of Letters degrees from Nyack College in 2014.

In 2010, Downey graduated from the University of Santa Monica with a master's degree in Spiritual Psychology.

Downey was appointed Officer of the Order of the British Empire (OBE) in the 2021 Birthday Honours for services to the arts, drama and the community in Northern Ireland.

Filmography

Television

 Film 

 Producer 

Discography
In 1999, Downey signed with RCA Victor Records and recorded a CD called Healing Angel'', released on 14 September 1999.

Stage

Awards and nominations

Publications
 "Love Is a Family." (2001). Harper Entertainment 
 "Box of Butterflies: Discovering the Unexpected Blessing All Around Us." (2018).

References

External links

 Roma Downey at Irish Central
 

20th-century actresses from Northern Ireland
21st-century actresses from Northern Ireland
Alumni of the Drama Studio London
Alumni of the University of Brighton
Film producers from Northern Ireland
Living people
People educated at Thornhill College
Actors from Derry (city)
Television actresses from Northern Ireland
British women film producers
Officers of the Order of the British Empire
Writers from Derry (city)
Mass media people from Derry (city)
1960 births